Huber's (originally The Bureau Saloon) is a restaurant in Portland, Oregon that bills itself as the city's oldest restaurant, having been established in 1879. Known for its turkey dinner and Spanish coffee, Huber's is often listed as a recommended restaurant to eat at in Portland. The establishment has also been featured in a film by Gus Van Sant. Huber's is within the Railway Exchange Building (now known as the Oregon Pioneer Building).

Description

Located in Portland's historic Pioneer Building, Huber's contains "arched stained-glass skylights, mahogany paneling and terrazzo flooring". Original fixtures such as spittoons, overhead lights, a pewter wine stand, and cash registers, fans, and operable clocks made of brass still remain, "reminders of its rich history". The restaurant's yellow and amber skylight was made by the Povey Brothers Studio.

Continuing with the tradition of preparing turkey dinners since the 1800s, Huber's prepares around 100 pounds of turkey each day to make "at least a dozen different dishes including the classic turkey dinner, hot and cold sandwiches, turkey marsala, cordon bleu, piccata, gumbo, drumsticks and wings, and Chinese barbecue turkey." Turkey-related foods that failed to catch on with patrons included "turkey coffee" (a combination of Wild Turkey bourbon, coffee and whipped cream) and an "Americanized" version of "turkey giblet chop suey". Spanish coffee has become the signature drink of Huber's, introduced by Jim Louie after "stealing" the idea from a bar in Milwaukie known as Fernwood Inn. Spanish coffee is made tableside with "great flair" and consists of rum, triple sec, Kahlúa, coffee, whipped cream, and nutmeg. In 1990, Huber's earned the distinction as the largest user of Kahlúa in the United States by an independent restaurant.

History

Huber's bills itself as the oldest restaurant in Portland, having been established in 1879 as The Bureau Saloon at the corner of 1st and Alder in downtown Portland. The name of the establishment changed to its current form after Frank Huber purchased The Bureau Saloon. Throughout its history, the restaurant has occupied four separate locations, settling in the Pioneer Building (its current location) shortly after it was built in 1910. During this time, Huber's was a saloon with a bar and spittoons where "downtown professionals spat their chewing tobacco".

After Huber died in 1912, Jim Louie took over management of the establishment. Louie, a stowaway Chinese immigrant, was the cook that helped to popularize the turkey dinners that Huber's is still known for today. During Prohibition, the saloon was converted into a restaurant and speakeasy so that food and alcoholic drinks could continue to be served. A few years after Louie's death, his nephew Andrew became the sole proprietor of Huber's in 1952. In 1960, Andrew introduced his eleven-year-old son James Kai Louie ("Jim") to the business, who eventually became an owner of the restaurant. David and Lucille Louie also became owners with the passing of Andrew in 1988 and his wife Amy in 1990.

The Railway Exchange Building and Huber's Restaurant were added to the National Register of Historic Places on March 13, 1979.

In 2010, Huber's was featured as a stop on the "Sweet Cakes, Long Journey" walking tour, which explores the history of Portland's Chinatown, not for its food but for being owned by the same Chinese family for multiple generations.

See also
 National Register of Historic Places listings in South and Southwest Portland, Oregon

References

External links

 
 KPTV news segment spotlighting Huber's

1879 establishments in Oregon
National Register of Historic Places in Portland, Oregon
Restaurants established in 1879
Restaurants in Portland, Oregon
Restaurants on the National Register of Historic Places
Southwest Portland, Oregon